Yusuf Idris, also Yusif Idris (May 19, 1927 – August 1, 1991) was an Egyptian writer of plays, short stories, and novels.

Idris was born in Faqous. He originally trained to be a doctor, studying at the University of Cairo. He sought to put the foundations of a modern Egyptian theatre based on popular traditions and folklore, his main success in this quest was his most famous work, a play called "Al-Farafeer" depicting two main characters: the Master and the Farfour (poor layman). For some time he was a regular writer in the famous daily newspaper Al-Ahram.

From the English edition of The Cheapest Nights:
"While a medical student his work against Farouk’s regime and the British led to his imprisonment and suspension from College. After graduation, he worked at Kasr el Eini, the largest government hospital in Egypt. He supported Nasser’s rise to power but became disillusioned in 1954 at the time when his first collection of stories  The Cheapest Nights was published .  . Yusuf Idris’ stories are powerful and immediate reflections of the experiences of his own rebellious life. His continuing contact with the struggling poor enables him to portray characters sensitively and imaginatively

Personal life
He married Raja al-Refai, with whom he had three children. His daughter Basma is also a published writer.

Works in English 

 Idris, Yusuf: The Cheapest Nights and Other Stories 1978, Peter Owen, London, (First UK edition),   (in the UNESCO Collection of Representative Works)
 Idris, Yusuf: The Sinners  1984,  U.S.A., (First English Language Edition.) (many reprints)  
 Idris, Yusuf: Rings of Burnished Brass 1992, American University in Cairo Press,  (translator: Catherine Cobham)
 Idris, Yusuf: City of Love and Ashes 1999, American University in Cairo Press,

Principal works 

Short Stories
 The Cheapest Nights. أرخص ليالى
 Isn't it ? أليس كذلك ؟
 Dregs of the city. قاع المدينة
 The Hero. البطل
 An incident of Honour.  حادثة شرف
 The End of the world.  آخر الدنيا  
 Tha Language of Oh Oh.  لغة الآى آى
 The summons.  النداهة
   بيت من لحم
 I am Sultan of the law of existence.  أنا سلطان قانون الوجود
 The Freak

 Plays 

 The Cotton King & Farahat's republic. Two Plays   ملك القطن  و  جمهورية فرحات
 The Critical Moment.اللحظة الحرجة
 Al-Farafir. الفرافير
 Earthly Comedy. المهزلة الأرضية
 The striped Ones. المخططين
 The Third Sex. الجنس الثالث
 Towards an Arabic Drama  نحو مسرح عربى
 The Harlequin  البهلوان

Novels and Novellas
 Farahat's Republic &  A Love story. [Two novellas] جمهورية فرحات و قصة حب
 The Sin. الحرام
 The Disgrace.  العيب
 Men and Bulls, The Black Soldier, Mrs. Vienna. [Novellas] رجال وثيران- العسكرى الأسود- السيدة فيينا
 The White.  البيضاء

Other writings
 Not very frankly speaking.  بصراحة غير مطلقة
 Discovery of a continent.  إكتشاف قارة
 The Will.  الإرادة
 Diary of Dr. yusuf Idris. مفكرة الدكتور يوسف إدريس
 The '60s Gabarty.  جبرتى الستينات

Awards and honours
Idris won the 1997 Naguib Mahfouz Medal for Literature for his novel City of Love and Ashes.

External links 
 Youssef Idrees from Egypt state information service.
 "Yusuf Idris of Egypt, Playwright, Dies at 64", New York Times, August 3, 1991.

1927 births
1991 deaths
People from Sharqia Governorate
Egyptian male short story writers
Egyptian short story writers
Egyptian novelists
Recipients of the Naguib Mahfouz Medal for Literature
20th-century novelists
20th-century short story writers
20th-century male writers
20th-century Egyptian writers
Cairo University alumni